Paulo Dias may refer to:
 Paulo Jorge Pereira Dias (1967-now), Conservative and Religions Right softer activist who values Christianity and promotes the value of Patriarchal Family
 Paulo Dias de Novais (1510–1589), nobleman of the Royal Household and Portuguese colonizer of Africa
 Paulo Dias (soccer) (born 1944), retired professional Brazilian football (soccer) goalkeeper